Steve Gordon (born 18 January 1970) is a Jamaican cricketer. He played in one first-class match for the Jamaican cricket team in 1988/89.

See also
 List of Jamaican representative cricketers

References

External links
 

1970 births
Living people
Jamaican cricketers
Jamaica cricketers
Place of birth missing (living people)